Eunice Wilson (April 2, 1911, Michigan – January 10, 1984, Los Angeles) was a singer, dancer, and actress who performed in the 1930s and was in 1930s films and a pair of late 1940s films. Her performances were featured in several films.

She performed in Leonard Reed's revue.

Filmography
Murder in Harlem (1935)
An All-Colored Vaudeville Show (1935), reworked and reissued as Dixieland Jamboree (1946) by Warner Brothers
Sun Tan Ranch (1948)
No Time for Romance (1948)

References

External links
Eunice Wilson page on Angelfire

1911 births
1984 deaths
20th-century African-American women singers
20th-century American people